Kwun Tong Future is a pro-democracy political group based in Kwun Tong, Hong Kong. It was founded in 2019. It has 1 seat in the District Councils.

Performance in elections

District Council elections

Leadership

Leaders

Representatives

District Councils
The Kwun Tong Future has won 1 seats in 1 District Councils (2020–2023):

References

Kwun Tong
2019 establishments in Hong Kong
Liberal parties in Hong Kong
Political parties established in 2019
Political parties in Hong Kong